The Minto Flats South Fire was a large lightning-caused wildfire in Interior Alaska south of Fairbanks that ignited in late June 2009. It was by far the largest in what was termed the "Railbelt complex" of fires, so named because they were all near the main route of the Alaska Railroad. Alaska was experiencing an unusually hot and dry start to the summer season, which in turn led to a very active wildfire season. By the time the Minto Flats fire had become the largest fire in Alaska, over seventy other blazes were active throughout the state, stretching resources to their limits. The main body of the fire was deemed too large to actually try to extinguish, and firefighting efforts were focused from the beginning on protecting lives and property. There is also an oil drilling rig in this area, and firefighters cleared the area surrounding it of fuel and instructed the drilling crew on the use of firefighting equipment. The fire was not declared under control until late August.

References

2009 in Alaska
2009 wildfires in the United States
Wildfires in Alaska
Yukon–Koyukuk Census Area, Alaska
June 2009 events in the United States
July 2009 events in the United States
August 2009 events in the United States